This is a list of winners and nominees of the Primetime Emmy Award for Outstanding Actor in a Short Form Comedy or Drama Series. These awards, like the guest acting awards, are not presented at the Primetime Emmy Awards show, but rather at the Creative Arts Emmy Award ceremony.

Winners and nominations

2010s

2020s

Notes

References

Actor - Short Form Comedy or Drama Series